The 1984 Buckeye Tennis Classic, also known as the Columbus Open, was a men's tennis tournament played on outdoor hardcourts at the Buckeye Boys Ranch in Grove City, a suburb of Columbus, Ohio in the United States that was part of the 1984 Volvo Grand Prix circuit. It was the 15th and final edition of the tournament and was held  from August 13 through August 19, 1984. Third-seeded Brad Gilbert won the singles title and earned $20,000 first-prize money.

Finals

Singles
 Brad Gilbert defeated  Hank Pfister 6–3, 3–6, 6–3
 It was Gilbert's 1st singles title of the year and the 2nd of his career.

Doubles
 Sandy Mayer /  Stan Smith defeated  Charles Bud Cox /  Terry Moor 6–4, 6–7, 7–5

References

External links
 ITF tournament edition details

1984 in American tennis
1984 Grand Prix (tennis)
1984 in sports in Ohio
August 1984 sports events in the United States